Aradippou Stadium is a stadium in Aradippou, Cyprus. It is the home ground of Ermis Aradippou and Omonia Aradippou. The stadium holds 2,500 people and is owned by Aradippou municipality.

References

Football venues in Cyprus
Buildings and structures in Larnaca District